Elections were held in Peterborough County, Ontario, on October 24, 2022, in conjunction with municipal elections across the province.

Peterborough County Council
Peterborough County Council consists of the mayors and deputy mayors from each of the county's constituent municipalities.

Asphodel-Norwood
The following were the results for mayor and deputy mayor of Asphodel-Norwood.

Mayor

Deputy mayor

Cavan Monaghan
The following were the results for mayor and deputy mayor of Cavan Monaghan.

Mayor
Incumbent mayor Scott McFadden did for re-election. Running to replace him is was deputy mayor Matthew Graham and former Peterborough mayor Daryl Bennett.

Deputy mayor

Douro-Dummer
The following were the results for mayor and deputy mayor of Douro-Dummer.

Mayor
Douro Ward councillor Heather Watson ran against businessman Jim Coyle.

Deputy mayor

Havelock-Belmont-Methuen
The following were the results for mayor and deputy mayor of Havelock-Belmont-Methuen.

Mayor
Incumbent mayor Jim Martin was challenged by former firefighter Rolf Joss.

Deputy mayor

North Kawartha
The following candidates are running for mayor and deputy mayor of North Kawartha.

Mayor

Deputy mayor

Otonabee-South Monaghan
Incumbent mayor Joe Taylor and deputy mayor Bonnie Clark have been re-elected by acclamation.

Mayor

Deputy mayor

Selwyn
The following candidates are running for mayor and deputy mayor of Selwyn.

Mayor
Mayor Andy Mitchell has announced he will not be running for re-election. Only deputy mayor Sherry Senis has announced they will be running for mayor so far.

Deputy mayor

Trent Lakes
The following were the results for mayor and deputy mayor of Trent Lakes.

Mayor

Deputy mayor

References

Peterborough
Peterborough County